Jeffrey Reeves (born 15 January 1936) is a British rower. He competed in the men's coxed pair event at the 1960 Summer Olympics.

References

1936 births
Living people
British male rowers
Olympic rowers of Great Britain
Rowers at the 1960 Summer Olympics
Sportspeople from Reading, Berkshire